Constantine VI (1859 – 28 November 1930) was Ecumenical Patriarch of Constantinople from 17 December 1924 till 22 May 1925. He served as a locum tenens following the death of Patriarch Gregory VII in 1924.

He was born in 1859 at Syge, near Bursa. After studies at the Halki seminary, he became bishop of Rodosto in 1896, metropolitan bishop of Vella and Konitsa in 1899, metropolitan of Trebizond in 1906, of Cyzicus in 1913 and finally of Derkoi in 1922.

He was exiled to Greece by the Turkish government on 30 January 1925 and resigned the Patriarchate a few months later.

See also
 Population exchange between Greece and Turkey

References

1859 births
1930 deaths
Theological School of Halki alumni
Bishops of Trebizond
People from Bursa
20th-century Ecumenical Patriarchs of Constantinople
Turkish exiles